is a passenger railway station in located in the city of Kainan, Wakayama Prefecture, Japan, operated by West Japan Railway Company (JR West).

Lines

Station layout
The station consists of two opposed side platforms connected by an underground passage. There is no station building. The station is unattended.

Platforms

Adjacent stations

|-
!colspan=5|West Japan Railway Company (JR West)

History
Shimizuura Station opened on December 15, 1938. It was relocated 400 meters towards Wakayama on September 1, 1961. With the privatization of the Japan National Railways (JNR) on April 1, 1987, the station came under the aegis of the West Japan Railway Company.

Passenger statistics
In fiscal 2019, the station was used by an average of 87 passengers daily (boarding passengers only).

Surrounding Area
 l

See also
List of railway stations in Japan

References

External links

 Shimizuura Station Official Site

Railway stations in Wakayama Prefecture
Railway stations in Japan opened in 1938
Kainan, Wakayama